The Gargoyle may refer to:

One of three student newspapers:
The Gargoyle (newspaper), University College, University of Toronto
Gargoyle Humor Magazine, University of Michigan
Flagler College Gargoyle, Flagler College
The Gargoyle (novel), by Andrew Davidson.
The Gargoyle, a children's novel by Garry Kilworth

See also
Gargoyle (disambiguation)